Manne Liimatainen (born 31 March 1943) is a Finnish cross-country skier. He competed in the men's 15 kilometre event at the 1972 Winter Olympics.

Cross-country skiing results

Olympic Games

References

External links
 

1943 births
Living people
Finnish male cross-country skiers
Olympic cross-country skiers of Finland
Cross-country skiers at the 1972 Winter Olympics
People from Kannonkoski
Sportspeople from Central Finland
20th-century Finnish people